National Primary Route 5, or just Route 5 (or ) is a National Road Route of Costa Rica, and it is a road from the area known as Tournón, in the triple limit of the Cinco Esquinas, Tibás district, Merced, San José district, and San Francisco, Goicoechea district in San José province to the Heredia district in the Heredia province of Costa Rica, and joins Route 108 and Route 3.

Description

The route is also an east parallel alternative to the San José to Heredia segment of Route 3.

In San José province the route covers Tibás canton (San Juan, Cinco Esquinas districts).

In Heredia province the route covers Heredia canton (Heredia district), Santo Domingo canton (Santo Domingo, San Vicente, Santa Rosa districts), San Pablo canton (San Pablo, Rincón de Sabanilla districts).

History

On 23 March 2020, the Heredia terminus section was bifurcated to improve the traffic, by making Route 5 into an Heredia outbound section, and annexing 1.5 km of the immediate north road, Avenida Joaquín Rodríguez, as Heredia inbound section, with a new semaphore at the joining point with Route 3.  This bifurcation provides two lanes in each way, but the right lane will be for public transportation exclusive use at peak traffic hours (06:00-08:30 and 15:00-19:00).  Both sections converge at the Route 5 and Calle 35 point, to one lane in each direction.

References

Highways in Costa Rica